Juan Luis Cebrián Echarri (born 30 October 1944) is a Spanish journalist and businessman, the co-founder of El País, and CEO of Prisa, a Spanish media conglomerate.

Cebrián was born in Madrid in 1944. He studied philosophy at the Universidad Complutense, and earned a bachelor's degree from the Escuela Oficial de Periodismo.

He has been editor-in-chief of the Spanish daily newspaper El País since 1976. Cebrián was elected to Seat V of the Real Academia Española in December 1996, and took up his seat in May 1997.

He was chairman of Prisa from 2012 to 2017. Cebrian is vice president of the Asociación de Medios de Información (AMI), chaired by Javier Moll, since May 2017.

Cebrián left all his executive positions in PRISA on May 21, 2018. The Presidency of El País was left to Manuel Mirat, and Cebrián was named Honorary President of El País. Cebrián has been considered by various international media as one of the ten most influential Spaniards in Spain and Latin America for 44 years (from 1976 to 2019). He was one of the founding members of the political magazine Cuadernos para el Dialogo and has worked as a senior worker and deputy editor of Pueblo and Informaciones de Madrid,a daily newspaper in which he worked with during the time periods of 1963 to 1975. He managed the news service Televisión Española as well as being the founding editor of the daily newspaper El País, in which he edited between 1976 to 1988. He was the chairman of the International Press Institute (I.P.I) between 1986 to 1988.

He is the only Hispanic academic member of the Bilderberg Club and the only Spanish-speaking member with executive functions in that organization.

Between 1980 and 2016 Cebrián has published 19 books in Spanish consisting of fiction and essay based writing, including the first part of his memoirs.

Cebrián has been named in the Panama Papers.

References

External links

1944 births
Living people
Complutense University of Madrid alumni
Members of the Royal Spanish Academy
People from Madrid
El País editors
People named in the Panama Papers